MMX may refer to:

 2010, in Roman numerals

Science and technology
 MMX (instruction set), a single-instruction, multiple-data instruction set designed by Intel
 MMX Mineração, a Brazilian mining company
 Martian Moons eXploration, a Japanese mission to retrieve samples from Mars' moon Phobos
 Michelson–Morley experiment, an 1887 physics experiment

Places
 MMX Open Art Venue, in Berlin, Germany
 Malmö Airport, Sweden (IATA code)

Arts and entertainment

Music
 "MMX (The Social Song)", a 2010 song by Enigma
 MMX (Twelfth Night album), 2010
 Napalm (album), original working title MMX, a 2012 album by Xzibit
 MMX, a 2012 album by Procol Harum
 MMX, a 2010 album by War from a Harlots Mouth
 Marble Machine X, a musical instrument designed by Swedish band Wintergatan

Video games
 Mega Man X, a series of video games, and its main character
 Might & Magic X: Legacy, a 2014 role-playing video game